The 1896 Iowa Hawkeyes football team represented the University of Iowa during the 1896 college football season. It was the first Hawkeye football team to win a conference championship. The Hawkeyes went undefeated against the likes of Kansas, Missouri and Nebraska and had only one loss, to Chicago. The team allowed only 12 points the entire season.

Schedule

References

Iowa
Iowa Hawkeyes football seasons
Iowa Hawkeyes football